Wayves was a Canadian print magazine, published 11 times yearly in Halifax, Nova Scotia for the lesbian, gay, bisexual and transgender communities in Atlantic Canada.

The magazine was published by a non-profit organization. It was first published in 1983 as a local community newsletter under the name Gaezette, and was in regular monthly production between 1988 and 2012. The magazine adopted its current name in 1995.

Since 2012, Wayves has published articles and news online and via Facebook.

Notes

External links
 Wayves
 Wayves Atlantic Canada LGBT Groups & Services Directory

1983 establishments in Nova Scotia
2012 disestablishments in Canada
LGBT-related magazines published in Canada
Monthly magazines published in Canada
Online magazines published in Canada
Magazines established in 1983
Magazines disestablished in 2012
Magazines published in Nova Scotia
Mass media in Halifax, Nova Scotia
Online magazines with defunct print editions